The Loveable Rogues were a British band from London, consisting of members Sonny Jay Muharrem, Eddie Brett and Te Qhairo Eugene, who rose to fame after reaching the final of the sixth series of Britain's Got Talent in 2012.

Career

2010–12: Britain's Got Talent
In 2012, The Loveable Rogues were asked by Britain's Got Talent producers to audition for the show. They performed two of their original compositions on the show, "Lovesick" and "Honest", both which were positively received by fans and the judges alike and were written by the three boys themselves. They had a fanbase before appearing on the show.  They finished in fourth place with 5.7% of the final vote, behind the winners Ashleigh and Pudsey and runners-up Jonathan & Charlotte.

2012–13: Record deal and First Things First
On 12 June 2012, they informed fans to check the papers of tomorrow for 'good news!'. This turned out to be the fact that the band had been signed to record label Syco Music.

In late 2012, the band released a free mixtape through their Soundcloud channel. The collection of songs was released as a free download and was called 'First Things First'. Their debut single, "What A Night" was previewed along with new songs such as "Maybe Baby", "Talking Monkeys" and "Honest". Covers were also on the mixtape including their version of "Charmless Man" and "I Wanna Be The Only One".

On 19 February 2013, they released the video for their debut single "What a Night". The song was released on 21 April 2013.

2012–13: Olly Murs support
In November 2012, the Loveable Rogues were confirmed as the support act for Olly Murs' 2013 Right Place Right Time arena nationwide tour. The tour included playing two sold-out hometown shows at London's The O2 Arena.

The Setlist is

1 Talking Monkeys
2 Honest
3 Lovesick
4 Sweet Lovin'
5 What a Night

2013–14: Drop from record label
On 18 October 2013, it was announced that the band had been dropped by their  record label Syco Music.

2014: After Syco
After being dropped by Syco Music the band teamed up with Alex Katter of Gravity MGMT and announced they will be releasing an EP entitled 'Honest' in May, followed by their debut album 'This & That' on 18 August. The boys finished their first ever headline tour 'The Talking Monkeys Tour' in March 2014 travelling across the UK to perform at different venues for their fans. Their second headline tour is called 'This & That'.  The tour is scheduled for November 2014.

The album This & That went straight into #37 on the UK Albums Chart with a high position of #6 on the iTunes chart.

Track Listing for 'This & That'

1. Sweet Lovin'
2. Talking Monkeys
3. What A Night
4. Honest
5. Love Sick
6. Story About Me
7. Someone You're Not
8. Everything's Better With You
9. This and That
10. Front Story
11. Nuthouse
12. Mr. Piano Man

2014–15: Split and life after
The Loveable Rogues announced that after their 'This & That Tour' in November that they will be parting ways. "To all our fans and followers – and anyone else who has dipped into our adventure over the past five years – we have some news," they said in a statement.

"The three of us, who you'll know as the Loveable Rogues, have made the tough, but self-assured decision to part ways at the end of the year.

"We've had the most incredible time as a band - writing, performing, touring and playing together for half a decade - but the time feels right to head in different directions and take on new endeavours."

They continued: "We were delighted to finally release our debut album this year, and the response and love for it was incredible, so thank you again to everyone who remained patient and bought it. It made the endurance worthwhile.

Post-band projects
Sonny Jay Muharrem joined Brentwood radio station Phoenix FM as a presenter in June 2015.  His show "Sonny Jay's Phoenix Nights" can be heard on Friday nights from 10pm-midnight. In 2016, Sonny joined Capital FM to present Thursday and Friday overnights. After just a year he joined Capital Breakfast with Roman Kemp and Vick Hope (later Sian Welby) and in 2023, he left Capital Breakfast to present The Capital Late Show Every Weekdays. Sonny won the thirteenth series of Dancing on Ice in March 2021.

Discography

Studio albums

Singles

 Honest charted on the UK Singles Chart as, under UK chart rules, EPs under a certain length are categorised as singles and are considered for inclusion in the singles chart instead of the albums chart.

References

Britain's Got Talent contestants
English boy bands
British indie pop groups
British musical trios
Syco Music artists
Musical groups established in 2010
2010 establishments in England
Musical groups disestablished in 2014
Musical groups from the London Borough of Waltham Forest